Damien Thorn is a fictional character and the primary antagonist of The Omen franchise. He is the Antichrist and the son of the Devil. The character has been portrayed by Harvey Spencer Stephens, Jonathan Scott-Taylor, Sam Neill, Seamus Davey-Fitzpatrick and Bradley James.

Appearances 
 The Omen (1976)
 Damien: Omen II (1978)
 Omen III: The Final Conflict (1981)
 The Omen (2006, remake)
 Damien (TV series)

Name etymology 
The name "Damien" sounds vaguely like the English "demon", but is not at all etymologically related (it means something like "the one who subdues").
Damien is the French form of the English name Damian (related to the Greek verb damao, meaning "to tame"), popular as the name of a martyred Christian saint of the third century (see Saints Cosmas and Damian).  Another prominent Damien was Father Damien of Hawaii, who died while establishing leper colonies there. Damien is also the first name of Father Karras in The Exorcist.

Fictional biography 
In the first film, but not its 2006 remake, Damien was born on the sixth day of June at six o'clock in the morning, from a jackal that died giving birth to him and was buried in Cerveteri under the alias Maria Scianna (in the remake this alias was changed to Maria Avedici Santoya). The orphaned Damien is then adopted by the future American ambassador to Great Britain Robert Thorn, who was told his child was stillborn, with his wife Katherine unaware of the replacement. It would be five years later, after Thorn becomes US ambassador to the Court of St. James's, that Damien's powers begin to manifest when his nanny mysteriously hangs herself at his birthday party, claiming to have done it for him. The strange events continue with new nanny Ms. Baylock, who is later revealed to be one of the Satanists who have been waiting for the boy and acting on his behalf from the shadows, as Damien's true nature starts to manifest, from his violent reaction to church to most animals reacting fearfully at the sight of him (save for the black dog that Ms. Baylock adopted).

Father Brennan, a priest from Italy who was present at Damien's birth, warns Robert about his son being the Antichrist, stating that Damien would eventually kill him and his wife. But Robert refuses to accept it until Katherine, revealed to be pregnant with another child, is hospitalized after being knocked off a balcony by Damien with his tricycle, a fall that kills the unborn baby. Accompanied by photojournalist Keith Jennings, who is eventually decapitated in a freak accident, Robert learns both the truth of Damien's heritage and the fact that his own child was actually murdered to ensure Damien's being placed in his care, so that he may rise up through the world of politics. An exorcist in Megiddo, Israel named Karl Bugenhagen gives Robert seven ancient daggers he inherited that can kill the Antichrist. Robert is initially against killing the boy until he finds the 666 birthmark that confirms his identity as the Antichrist. But when Robert brings Damien to a church to commit the deed, he is killed by police before Damien is harmed.  At Robert's funeral, Damien is seen in the company of the President of the United States before being adopted by his uncle, Richard Thorn. To ensure that the last of his enemies are dealt with, Damien's subconscious will kills off Bugenhagen, who attempted to have Michael Morgan deliver a box containing the Daggers of Megiddo to Richard before the two were buried alive in the ruins.

In the second film, set seven years after the first movie, the twelve-year-old Damien lives with his uncle's family: Richard's second wife, Ann, and his son from his first marriage, Mark. Originally, as with the first film, Damien is unaware of his powers, subconsciously killing any who learn his secret and pose a threat to him. Furthermore, besides Ms. Baylock, Damien is supported by other Satanic acolytes who eventually help him learn his true nature during his time in military school. Though frightened at first, Damien accepts his unholy lineage and his destiny, though it's with reluctance that he kills Mark when the latter learns the truth and refuses to join him. Though disbelieving Damien's lineage at first, Richard learns the truth and attempts to set a trap for Damien, to kill him with the Daggers of Megiddo. But Ann, revealed to be a Satanist, kills Richard before Damien incinerates her out of disgust while burning the Thorn museum to the ground. From there, as revealed in the third film, Damien eventually takes over his uncle's company and turns it into a global business corporation.

By the events of Omen III: The Final Conflict, revealed to have attended Oxford, the adult Damien arranges his appointment as Ambassador to Great Britain and overseer of the United Nations Youth Associations. But his reason for taking on his father's position is that Britain is where the Second Coming will occur during an alignment in the Cassiopeia constellation and he needs to find and kill the Christ-child before his power completely wanes. While dealing with assassins under Father DeCarlo, who each possess a dagger of Megiddo salvaged from the ruins of the Thorn museum, Damien has his numerous followers kill every male British child born on the morning of March 24. But the Christ-child is revealed to have eluded Damien's followers. Another hindrance to his dominion comes from journalist Kate Reynolds and her adolescent son Peter. Damien's fascination with them proves to be his undoing as he is eventually killed when Reynolds stabs him in the back while he attempts to kill DeCarlo (after using Peter as a shield). Damien lives long enough to see a vision of Christ and dies telling Him that He has won nothing.

In Omen IV: The Awakening, Damien is revealed to have a biological child in Delia, who was originally assumed to be the Antichrist reborn. According to the plot of the previous film, the Kingdom of Christ began much earlier and Armageddon was not prevented, but only delayed. However, the Satanists who are responsible for orchestrating Delia's birth reveal that she is actually the protector of the new Antichrist, her embryonic twin brother (which is very similar to Second Coming, but from the side of evil), who was inside her body before being transferred into Delia's adoptive mother Karen York. The newborn Alexander York survives his mother's death, after which he, Delia, and their father Gene attend Karen's funeral.

The Omen remakes 

A Hollywood remake was made featuring Liev Schreiber, Julia Stiles and Seamus Davey-Fitzpatrick. The plot of the remake closely follows that of the original film. The Omen was also remade in Tamil in 1991 under the title Jenma Natchathram.

Analysis 
George Ochoa, in his book Deformed and Destructive Beings: The Purpose of Horror Films, identifies Damien Thorn from The Omen films as a "deformed and destructive being". Ochoa writes that horror film audiences possess an ambivalence of horror and delight over the continued existence of the film's "monster". He says of Damien, "It is horrifying to realize that the boy survived the final battle with his adoptive father... but it is also pleasing, because Damien—in company with... [the] ever-present Satan—is a well-realized DDB." He says the presentation of Damien as a character in the original The Omen is accentuated by his defeat of his adoptive father, who is played by Gregory Peck, known for leading man and heroic roles. In the remake, however, Damien defeats his adoptive father, played by Liev Schreiber, who is "not associated with playing heroes". Ochoa concludes, "The result was that [Schreiber's character's] defeat by the little boy was neither exceptional nor horrifying, just forgettable."

James F. Iaccino analyzed Damien in The Omen with Jungian psychology, "To paraphrase Jung, his psyche is animalistic, primordial, and monstrous to behold. It further contains within its very core an awesome supernatural element, setting the bearer apart from all others." Since Damien is an orphan on Earth, his survival means he has "accomplished something truly godlike". When Damien uses his powers, Iaccino says "they are typically accompanied by a fierceness and rage" that reflects the Jungian interpretation of "the primordial child's being depicted as an inhuman". Damien has a relationship with wild dogs that indicates "his mystical link with the barbaric world of the primitive". Iaccino says that Damien's life (in the original film) is spared because Damien "can appear angelic and pure to those around him while concealing his depraved nature", which is why his adoptive father hesitates to kill him. In Omen II, Iaccino notes Damien's relationship with the raven, which "is one of the devil's common guises" in fairy tales. When satanists help educate Damien "in the ways of evil", the growing boy becomes fully conscious of his true nature. Iaccino explains, "He is able to detach himself somewhat from the instinctual sphere of the beast (as well as the innocence of the child) to develop a stronger, more liberating identity." After Damien's realization, the raven no longer appears in the film, indicating that it has been "integrated into Damien's conscience". In Omen III: The Final Conflict, Damien is an adult with an empire that thrives "on the misfortunes of others". He lacks faith or trust in others and does not want to admit needing anyone to survive. When he questions the Christ replica, he is "the Jungian image of archaic man" who believes that any action "must produce a significant reaction in the world", which is why he forces the crown of thorns on the replica's head.

See also 
 List of fictional Antichrists

References 

Adoptee characters in films
Fictional avatars
Film characters introduced in 1976
Child characters in film
Fictional demons and devils
Fictional depictions of the Antichrist
Fictional diplomats
Fictional mass murderers
Fictional Satanists
Fictional politicians
Fictional rapists
Male horror film villains
The Omen (franchise)
Fictional characters from Chicago
Orphan characters in film